Knight Without Armour (published in the USA as Without Armour) is a British thriller novel by James Hilton, first published in 1933. A British secret agent in Russia rescues the daughter of a Tsarist minister from a group of Bolshevik revolutionaries.

Adaptation

The novel was the basis for the 1937 British film Knight Without Armour directed by Jacques Feyder and starring Marlene Dietrich and Robert Donat. It was made at Denham Studios by Alexander Korda's London Films. Hilton's original story was adapted into a screenplay by Frances Marion, Lajos Bíró and Arthur Wimperis.

Bibliography
 Head, Dominic. The Cambridge Guide to Literature in English. Cambridge University Press, 2006.

References

1933 British novels
British novels adapted into films
Novels by James Hilton
Novels set in the 1910s
Novels set in Russia
Novels set in the Russian Revolution